The Green Man at Inglewhite is a public house in Inglewhite, Lancashire, England.

The pub, which was established in 1809, has been owned since January 2017 by Mikoh Inns, which also owns The White Bull in Bilsborrow, Lancashire, about three miles to the west.

In 1986, Inglewhite was designated a conservation area. It was appraised again a decade later. A 2011 review "re-evaluates its special architectural and historic interest in line with the requirements of the Town & Country (Listed Buildings and Conservation Areas) Act 1990 using the latest best practice guidance produced by English Heritage." In 2011, Preston City Council designated The Green Man one of eight sites of special interest in the village.

The building is also notable for its use of the now-rare Westmorland slate on its roof.

Gallery

References

External links
Official website of The Green Man at Inglewhite
The Green Man at Inglewhite at Geograph.co.uk

Pubs in Lancashire
Buildings and structures in the City of Preston
1809 establishments in England
Goosnargh